Chantal Contouri (born 1950; sometimes credited as Chantal Cantouri) is a Greek Australian television and film actress and former dancer, best known for her role in the 1970s soap opera Number 96, as nurse Tracy Wilson, later revealed to be the serial killer known as the infamous "pantyhose strangler".

Biography

Contouri was born in Agios Georgios, Greece in 1950, the first of five children to Fotini and Konstantinos, the family emigrated to Australia aboard an Italian ship Castel Felice in 1954; and settled in Adelaide, where Contouri attended Adelaide High School, where she learned English, after leaving home she started her career as a dancer, and appeared on music show Kommotion, before venturing into acting. She was the first Greek actress to win a Logie Award. She has had guest and recurring roles in series and soap opera and Australian films.

She featured in The Sullivans as Melina Tsangarakis, who married Norm Baker before her death by firing squad. Contouri appeared in US daytime soap opera General Hospital in 1988 and played a guest role in Australian teen soap E Street in 1993.

She played leading roles in Barry McKenzie Holds His Own (1974) and the sex comedy film Alvin Purple Rides Again (1974), and later had a guest role in the Alvin Purple television series produced in 1976. Contouri had starring roles in horror-suspense films Thirst (1979) and Snapshot (aka The Day After Halloween) (1979). She featured in Timothy Spanos' film The House Cleaner in 2013, playing an alcoholic acting agent and her most recent role was in a remake of Stormboy in 2019.

Contouri remains best known however as Nurse Tracey Wilson in serial Number 96 and in 2007 discussed her time on the series in an episode of Where Are They Now?, and revealed that she runs the family's restaurant in Adelaide. The restaurant closed in 2014, she currently resides in Torrensville, South Australia.
Contouri recorded an audio commentary for a 2008 DVD boxed set release of 32 Number 96 episodes, entitled The Pantyhose Strangler.

Filmography

FILM

TELEVISION
{|class="wikitable"
|Year
|Title
|Role
|Type
|-
| 1966
| Kommotion
| Herself - Go-go dancer
| TV series
|-
| 1974
| The Champions
| Lead role
| ABC Teleplay
|-
| 1974
| Certain Women
| Recurring role
| ABC TV series
|-
| 1974
| Behind The Scenes From 'Barry McKenzie Holds His Own| Herself / Zizi
| TV special
|-
| 1974-1975
| Number 96
| Regular role: Tracey Wilson
| TV series, 37 episodes
|-
| 1975
| Casino 10
| Regular role: Herself - Game hostess with Garry Meadows
| TV series
|-
| 1975
| Shannon's Mob
| Guest role: Tara
| TV series, 1 episode
|-
| 1975
| Silent Number
| Guest role: Marie
| TV series, 1 episode
|-
| 1975
| McManus M.P.B.
| Support role: Lara Boltolavic
| TV movie
|-
| 1975
| Celebrity Squares
| Herself - Panelist
| TV series, 1 episode
|-
| 1976
| Alvin Purple
| Guest role: Christine
| ABC TV series, 1 episode 7: 'The Hustled'
|-
| 1976
| Is There Anybody There?
| Lead role: Rosa
| TV movie
|-
| 1977
| Graham Kennedy's Blankety Blanks
| Herself - Panelist
| TV series, 2 episodes
|-
| 1977
| Greek Affair
| Herself
| TV series
|-
| 1978;1979
| Chopper Squad
| Guest roles: Diana Baker / Janie Smart
| TV series, 2 episodes
|-
| 1978
| The Sullivans
| Guest lead role: Melina / Melina Baker
| TV series, 15 episodes
|-
| 1979
| The 21st Annual TV Week Logie Awards
| Herself
| TV special
|-
| 1979
| Doctor Down Under
| Guest role: Dr. Wainwright
| TV series, 1 episode
|-
| 1979
| Sammy Awards 1979
| Herself - Compere
| TV special
|-
| 1980
| Skyways
| Guest role: Lorraine Cruickshank
| TV series, 1 episode
|-
| 1980
| The Three Sea-Wolves
| Lead role: Laura Fiore
| TV movie
|-
| 1980
| Parkinson In Australia
| Herself - Guest
| ABC TV series, 1 episode
|-
| 1980
| The Variety Club Race Day
| Herself
| TV special
|- 
| 1980
| The 1980 Australian Film Awards
| Herself - Presenter
| ABC TV special
|-
| 1980
| Olivia Newton-John: Hollywood Nights
| Herself - Audience member
| TV special, US
|-
| 1980
| Who Are We?
| Herself
| TV documentary
|-
| 1981
| Play Bouzouki
| Herself - Host
| TV special
|-
| 1981
| Holiday Island
| Guest role
| TV series, 1 episode
|-
| 1982;1983
| The Daryl Somers Show
| Herself - Guest
| TV series, 2 episodes
|-
| 1982
| The Black Boomerang aka 'Der schwarze Bumerang'
| Lead role: Minou
| TV miniseries FRANCE/AUSTRIA/SWITZERLAND/WEST GERMANY, 4 episodes
|-
| 1983
| All The Rivers Run
| Recurring role: Julia
| TV miniseries, 2 episodes
|-
| 1984
| Medea
| Lead role: Medea
| TV movie
|-
| 1988
| General Hospital
| Regular role: Prunella
| TV series US, 12 episodes
|-
| 1988
| Goodbye Miss Fourth Of July
| Lead role: Olymbia Janus
| TV movie, US
|-
| 1989
| The Home Show
| Herself - Guest
| TV series US, 1 episode
|-
| 1989
| International It's A Knockout
| Herself - Contestant
| TV special
|-
| 1991
| The Midday Show
| Herself - Guest
| TV series, 1 episode
|-
| 1991;1992
| Tonight Live With Steve Vizard
| Herself - Guest
| TV series, 2 episodes
|-
| 1991
| Celebrity Wheel Of Fortune
| Herself - Contestant
| TV series, 1 episode
|-
| 1991
| Celebrity Family Feud
| Herself - Guest
| TV series, 1 episode
|-
| 1991
| The World Tonight
| Herself - Guest
| TV series, 1 episode
|-
| 1991
| Team Family Feud
| Herself
| TV series, 1 episode
|-
| 1992
| The Morning Show
| Herself - Regular Presenter
| TV series
|-
| 1992
| Neighbours
| Guest role: Alexandra Lomax
| TV series, 2 episodes
|- 
| 1992
| E Street
| Recurring role: Julia Preston
| TV series, 9 episodes
|-
| 1993-1999
| Good Morning Australia
| Herself - Guest
| TV series, 7 episodes
|-
| 1993
| Insiders
| Herself
| TV series, 1 episode
|-
| 1994
| Chantal Contouri Inside Hollywood
| Herself
| TV special, US
|-
| 1994
| Is This Your Life?
| Herself - Guest
| TV series UK, 1 episode 'Olivia Newton-John'
|-
| 1995
| At Home
| Herself - Guest
| TV series, 1 episode
|-
| 1998
| Denise
| Herself - Guest
| TV series, 1 episode
|-
| 1999
| Beauty And The Beast
| Herself - Guest
| TV series, 3 episodes
|-
| 2003
| George Negus Tonight
| Herself - Guest
| ABC TV series, 1 episode
|-
| 2006
| Where Are They Now?
| Herself - Guest with Number 96 cast
| TV series, 1 episode
|-
| 2009
| The Cook and The Chef
| Herself - Guest
| ABC TV series, 1 episode
|-
| 2012
| Myf Warhurst's Nice
| Herself - Guest
| ABC TV series, 1 episode
|-
| 2014
| When The Beatles Drove Us Wild
| Herself
| ABC TV special
|-
| 2014
| Wastelander Panda
| Lead role: Varrick
| TV series, 5 episodes
|-
| 2021
| Aftertaste
| Guest role: Mama
| ABC TV series, 1 episode
|}STAGE/THEATRE'''
 Snap (1976)
 The Portage To San Cristobal Of AH (1983)
 The Shifting Heart (1985)
 The Boom Boom Show (US) (1986)
 Bacchae (1992)
 Medea (1995)
 To Traverse Water (1995)
 Emma Shelley Brazioni (1996)
 Milk And Honey (1996)
 Life Goes On (1997)
 The Village Of Miracles'' (1999)

References

External links
 
 Interview with George Negus-2003 
 DVD release: Number 96: The Pantyhose Strangler (2008)

1950 births
20th-century Australian actresses
Living people
Actresses from New South Wales
Australian television actresses
Greek emigrants to Australia
Logie Award winners
21st-century Australian women
21st-century Australian people
People educated at Adelaide High School
Actresses from Adelaide